The Food City 300 is a NASCAR Xfinity Series stock car race that takes place under the lights at Bristol Motor Speedway in Bristol, Tennessee. It is held the night before the NASCAR Cup Series race the Bass Pro Shops NRA Night Race. Until 2021, the race was the second of two Xfinity events at Bristol.

First held as a 150-lap event, the race has increased in length several times, first to 200 laps in 1985, and to 250 laps in 1990. In 2014, the length of the race was increased to 300 laps, making it the same number of laps as the spring race.

Past winners

2004, 2005, 2009, 2015-16, 2018 and 2021: Races extended due to NASCAR overtime.

Multiple winners (drivers)

Multiple winners (teams)

Manufacturer wins

References

External links

1982 establishments in Tennessee
NASCAR Xfinity Series races
 
Recurring sporting events established in 1982
Annual sporting events in the United States